Neolaeops microphthalmus, the crosseyed flounder, is a deep water species of lefteye flounder found in the Indian and Western Pacific Oceans. This species grows to a length of  SL. This species is the only known member of its genus.

References
 

Bothidae
Fish described in 1969